Steenacker is a Belgian surname. Notable people with the surname include:

Fernand Steenacker (1931–2018), Belgian rower
Henri Steenacker (1926–1993), Belgian rower, brother of Fernand

Dutch-language surnames